Danse Macabre Remixes is the second remix album (following the limited pressing of the Blank-Wave Arcade Remix LP) by the indie rock band The Faint, with remixes from their 2001 album Danse Macabre. It was released on April 1, 2003. There is also a special triple vinyl edition featuring a bonus remix of the track Violent by local Omaha, Nebraska artist, Adam Willis.

Track listing
All tracks by The Faint

"The Conductor" (Thin White Duke Mix by Stuart Price) – 7:52
"Posed to Death" (remixed by The Calculators) – 4:49
"Glass Danse" (remixed by Paul Oakenfold) – 5:39
"Let the Poison Spill from Your Throat" (Let The Clock Punch Redux by Tommie Sunshine) – 5:09
"The Total Job" (remixed by Photek) – 5:16
"Agenda Suicide" (remixed by Jagz Kooner) – 5:05
"Your Retro Career Melted" (remixed by Ursula 1000) – 5:14
"Posed to Death" (remixed by Mojolators) – 6:46 
"Violent" (remixed by Junior Sanchez) – 7:18
"Ballad of a Paralysed Citizen" (remixed by Medicine) – 4:42
"Violent" (remixed by Adam Willis) – 7:18 *Vinyl only

Personnel 

The Calculators – Producer, Remixing
The Faint – Compilation, Track Engineer
Ian Green – Programming, Engineer
Errol Kolosine – Compilation
Jagz Kooner – Producer, Remixing
Brad Laner – Producer, Remixing
Emily Lazar – Mastering
Jacques Lu Cont – Producer, Remixing
Mike Mogis – Track Engineer
Justin Nichols – Producer, Remixing
Paul Oakenfold – Remixing
Photek – Producer, Remixing
Sarah Register – Assistant
Junior Sanchez – Producer, Remixing
Tommie Sunshine – Producer
Ursula 1000 – Producer, Remixing
Mark Verbos – Engineer

The Faint albums
2003 remix albums
Astralwerks remix albums